Macroderma  may refer to:
 Macroderma (bat), a genus of bats in the family Megadermatidae
 Macroderma (fungus), a genus of fungi in the family Cryptomycetaceae